Brooklyn Township may refer to:

 Brooklyn Township, Lee County, Illinois
 Brooklyn Township, Schuyler County, Illinois
 Brooklyn Township, Susquehanna County, Pennsylvania
 Brooklyn Township, Williams County, North Dakota, in Williams County, North Dakota
 Brooklyn Township, Lincoln County, South Dakota

Township name disambiguation pages